Eugene R. "Gene" Merriam (born November 1, 1944) was an American businessman and politician.

Born in Minneapolis, Minnesota, Merriam graduated from Benilde-St. Margaret's High School in 1962. Merriam served in the United States Marine Corps. In 1967, Merriam graduated from University of Minnesota and was a certified public accountant. He lived in Coon Rapids, Minnesota. He served on the Coon Rapids City Council in 1973 and 1974 and was a Democrat. From 1975 until 1997, Merriam served in the Minnesota State Senate. From 2003 to 2007, Merriam served as commissioner of the Minnesota Department of Natural Resources.

Notes

1944 births
Living people
People from Coon Rapids, Minnesota
Politicians from Minneapolis
University of Minnesota alumni
Businesspeople from Minneapolis
Minnesota city council members
Democratic Party Minnesota state senators
State cabinet secretaries of Minnesota